Michael Jon Leeson (died July 27, 2016) was an American screenwriter.

Filmography 
 Love, American Style (1972–1973) (TV)
 All in the Family (1973) (TV)
 The Partridge Family (1973–1974) (TV)
 The Odd Couple (1972–1974) (TV)
 Happy Days (1974) (TV)
 The Mary Tyler Moore Show (1975) (TV)
 Phyllis (1975–1976) (TV)
 Rhoda (1975–1976) (TV)
 Mixed Nuts (1977) (TV)
 Fast Lane Blues (1978) (TV)
 The Associates (1979) (TV)
 Taxi (1978–1980) (TV)
 Best of the West (1981) (TV)
 Jekyll and Hyde... Together Again (with Monica Johnson, Harvey Miller and Jerry Belson) (1982)
 The Survivors (1983)
 When Your Lover Leaves (1983) (TV)
 The Tracey Ullman Show (1987) (TV)
 I Married Dora (1987–1988) (TV)
 The War of the Roses (1989)
 Grand (1990) (TV)
 Davis Rules (1992) (TV)
 The Cosby Show (1984–1992) (TV)
 I.Q. (with Andy Breckman) (1994)
 What Planet Are You From? (with Garry Shandling) (2000)
 The Tuxedo (2002)
 Twenty Good Years (2006) (TV)
 The Bill Engvall Show (2007–2009) (TV)

Awards and nominations 

Awards
 1990, BMI TV Music Award, "Grand", Shared with Tom Snow
 1985, Emmy, Outstanding Writing in a Comedy Series, "The Cosby Show" (1984), Shared with: Ed. Weinberger, For the "Pilot".
 1981, Emmy, Outstanding Writing in a Comedy Series, "Taxi" (1978), For episode "Tony's Sister and Jim".
 1979, Humanitas Prize, 30 Minute Category, "Taxi" (1978)

Nominations
 1991, BAFTA Film Award, Best Screenplay – Adapted, The War of the Roses (1989)
 1980, Emmy, Outstanding Writing in a Comedy Series, "The Associates" (1979) For episode "The First Day".
 1979, Emmy, Outstanding Writing in a Comedy or Comedy-Variety or Music Series, "Taxi" (1978) For episode "Blind Date".

References

External links 
 

American male screenwriters
Primetime Emmy Award winners
Showrunners
American male songwriters
American male television writers

2016 deaths
Year of birth missing